Tara-Lynne O'Neill (born 16 November 1975) is a film, theatre and television actress from Northern Ireland.

Early life
Growing up she was an aspiring dentist, but abandoned this, after failing her General Certificate of Secondary Education in Chemistry. At Sixth form college she opted for a career in acting.

Career

Film and television
O'Neill started work as a television presenter on Saturday Disney from 1993 to 1996. She was also a main presenter on a young-people television show, The Over the Wall Gang for BBC Northern Ireland. She later played Joanne Ryan in EastEnders between 20 September 2002 and 21 August 2003.

O'Neill also appeared in film roles such as the town's seductress in The Most Fertile Man in Ireland (1999), as Claire McKee in “Wild About Harry” (2000), 2013-2016 saw her appear in The Fall. In 2018, she joined the main cast of Derry Girls as Mary Quinn. The second series of Derry Girls premiered on 5 March 2019.

Other role includes The Informant (1997), Disco Pigs (2001), Full Circle and Omagh (2004).

Stage
In addition to television and film, at age 19 she appeared on stage at the Grand Opera House in Belfast as Sandy in a production of the musical "Grease".

In 2006 O'Neill appeared as Rita in a theatre production of Educating Rita staged at the Lyric Theatre in Belfast.

In 2021 she wrote and starred in Rough Girls, a play about women's football in Belfast in 1917–21; it was aired on BBC Four in 2022.

References

External links

Irish stage actresses
Irish television actresses
Film actresses from Northern Ireland
Living people
Musical theatre actresses from Northern Ireland
Stage actresses from Northern Ireland
Actresses from Belfast
Television actresses from Northern Ireland
1975 births